The Simbirsk electoral district was a constituency created for the 1917 Russian Constituent Assembly election. The electoral district covered the Simbirsk Governorate. Electoral participation was reported at around 58%.

Results

References

Electoral districts of the Russian Constituent Assembly election, 1917